Albert W. Wishard (1854-July 11, 1917) was an American attorney and politician. Wishard served in the Indiana State Senate for two terms and was a United States Attorney. A Republican, Wishard was also was the campaign manager for Charles W. Fairbanks two Senate campaigns.

Early life and education

Albert W. Wishard was born in 1854 in Greenwood, Indiana. His father was physician W. H. Wishard and his mother was Harriet Wishard. Wishard had one sister, Elizabeth. When Wishard was ten, his family moved to Marion County, settling in Southport. He attended Wabash College and graduated in 1876. Wishard studied law at John Coburn's law firm.

Career and life in politics

After passing the bar, Wishard was partner in John Coburn's firm, Test & Coburn, followed by being a partner with J. E. Florea. He eventually founded his own firm.

Politics

In 1884, Wishard ran for the Indiana House of Representatives as a Republican representing Marion, Shelby and Bartholomew Counties. In 1888, he married Carrie Wallace in Indianapolis. One year later, in 1889, Wallace filed to divorce Wishard. The couple divorced, and Wishard would keep in touch with Wallace via letters.

In 1900, Wishard was appointed solicitor for the Internal Revenue Service (IRS) by President William McKinley.
On March 1, 1903, Wishard resigned from his position as solicitor for the IRS. He left Washington and moved back to Indianapolis where he returned to his law practice. In 1906, he and Carrie Wallace agreed to marry and eloped in Chicago with Wallace's mother as a witness.

Later life and death

Wishard died in Indianapolis on July 11, 1917 from dilated cardiomyopathy. He was buried at Crown Hill Cemetery.

Legacy

Wishard's correspondence is held in the collection of the Indiana State Library.

References

1854 births
1917 deaths
People from Greenwood, Indiana
Republican Party Indiana state senators
United States Attorneys for the District of Indiana
Wabash College alumni
Politicians from Indianapolis
Internal Revenue Service people
Burials at Crown Hill Cemetery
American campaign managers